Kaarle August Kankari (28 January 18895 June 1948) was a Finnish trade unionist, politician and member of the Parliament of Finland, the national legislature. A member of the Socialist Workers' Party, he represented Uusimaa between September 1922 and October 1923.

Kankari was born on 28 January 1889 in Paimio. He was a carpenter in Uskela and Helsinki. He was chairman of the Finnish Woodworkers Union from 1917 to 1918 and from 1919 to 1921. Kankari was imprisoned for political reasons following the end of the Finnish Civil War in 1918. He was released in 1919. He was an Finnish Trade Union Federation official from 1921 to 1922 and chairman of the Finnish Sawmill, Transport and Mixed Workers Union from 1922 to 1924. 

Kankari was imprisoned again in August 1923 and a third time in the early 1930s. He was an Finnish Paper Association official from 1929 to 1930. He was a carpenter in Turku until his death on 5 June 1948.

References

1889 births
1948 deaths
Carpenters
Finnish prisoners and detainees
Finnish trade unionists
Members of the Parliament of Finland (1922–24)
People from Turku and Pori Province (Grand Duchy of Finland)
Political prisoners
Prisoners and detainees of Finland
Socialist Workers Party of Finland politicians